Bdella is a genus of mites belonging to the family Bdellidae.

The species of this genus are found in Europe and Northern America.

Species:

Bdella aloios 
Bdella bakeri 
Bdella biroi 
Bdella boskopensis 
Bdella captiosa 
Bdella cardinalis 
Bdella carolae 
Bdella consobrinae 
Bdella crassipes 
Bdella cytoides 
Bdella dispar 
Bdella distincta 
Bdella dorsata 
Bdella farabii
Bdella grandjeani 
Bdella heliophila 
Bdella histrionica 
Bdella horvathi 
Bdella humida 
Bdella iconica 
Bdella illinoisensis 
Bdella interrupta 
Bdella karajiensis 
Bdella khasyana 
Bdella lattakia 
Bdella lignicola 
Bdella longicornis 
Bdella longipalpus 
Bdella longistriata 
Bdella malaccensis 
Bdella malawiensis 
Bdella maldahaensis 
Bdella muscorum 
Bdella neograndjeani 
Bdella nihoaensis 
Bdella nylsvleyensis 
Bdella phoenicea 
Bdella piggotti 
Bdella pinicola 
Bdella pulchella 
Bdella radhikae 
Bdella semiscutata 
Bdella septentrionalis 
Bdella spinirostris 
Bdella spinirostris 
Bdella strandi 
Bdella subulirostris 
Bdella taurica 
Bdella tenuirostris 
Bdella tlascalana 
Bdella trisetosa 
Bdella tropica 
Bdella uchidai 
Bdella ueckermanni 
Bdella utilis 
Bdella validipes 
Bdella vatakarae 
Bdella vates 
Bdella vetusta 
Bdella vivida

References

Acari